K. S. Ravikumar (born 30 May 1958) is an Indian film director, screenwriter, producer, actor, primarily working in Tamil films.

Career

1990–1997 
Ravikumar assisted various directors such as Bharathiraja, Vikraman, E. Ramdoss, Nagesh, Ramarajan and K. Rangaraj. Ravikumar worked as co-director on R. B. Choudary's production Pudhu Vasantham directed by Vikraman and the success of the film prompted the producer to give Ravikumar a chance to make his directorial debut. Ravikumar thus debuted as a film maker through Puriyaadha Pudhir (1990), a crime thriller starring Rahman and Raghuvaran. A remake of the Kannada film Tarka, the film won positive reviews upon release and remains as Ravikumar's only film outside the masala film genre. The success of the film meant that Ravikumar was able to expand his team of assistants and shortly after began work on a film under the same production house titled Pudhu Kaaviyam with Vikram in the lead role, though the venture was later shelved. He subsequently switched his genre of films to make a series of village action entertainers and regularly collaborated with actor Sarath Kumar, scoring successes with Cheran Pandiyan (1991) and Nattamai (1994), after which he became a highly sought after film maker in the Tamil film industry.

Ravikumar then signed on to make Muthu (1995), adapting Priyadarshan's Malayalam film Thenmavin Kombath, for a film produced by K. Balachander and starring Rajinikanth. Despite buying the official remake rights, he worked on his own screenplay, and the film consequently went on to gain "cult classic" status in India and Japan, as well as becoming one of the most profitable Tamil films till date at release. Soon after he worked with Kamal Haasan for the first time in Avvai Shanmugi (1996), an Indian adaptation of the American comedy film, Mrs. Doubtfire. The film, also featuring Meena and Gemini Ganesan, won positive reviews and performed well at the box office. The Hindu praised the film claiming "turns out to be entertainer, mouthful from start to finish". The success of his two films with the two leading Tamil actors prompted further opportunities in big productions in 1997, notably Vijayakanth's Dharma Chakkaram and the comedy Pistha featuring Karthik.

1998–2010 
In December 1997, Ravikumar announced his next project Padayappa (1999) would feature Rajinikanth again as the lead actor with Sivaji Ganesan also in a pivotal role. Though principal photography for the film was supposed to have started in April 1998, the FEFSI strike that took place at that time delayed the project. After the strike ended, Ravikumar was able to complete Arjun's Kondattam and the successful drama with Sarath Kumar, Natpukkaga (1998). The film was further delayed when Ravikumar accepted to quickly remake Natpukkaga in Telugu as Sneham Kosam (1999) with Chiranjeevi in the lead. The shoot of Padayappa began in November 1998 and was subsequently completed in three months, with the film became a blockbuster upon release, as well as earning positive reviews from critics. Following the success of Padayappa, producer K. R. Gangadharan signed Ravikumar to direct a film and was insistent that the title should be Minsara Kanna (1999), after the popular song from Ravikumar's earlier film. His only collaboration with actor Vijay till date, the film opened to below average reviews collections. He then completed the village action film Paattali (1999) with Sarath Kumar within a month, as well as directing a portion of the record-breaking comedy drama Suyamvaram, bringing his release count for the year to five. Ravikumar consequently worked on his first home production through the comedy film Thenali (2000), starring Kamal Haasan in the titular role. While his wife Karpagam produced the film under his home studio RK Celluloids, Ravikumar worked on the screenplay and direction for the film also starring Jayaram, Jyothika and Devayani. Completing the film swiftly despite avid publicity, Thenali won critical and commercial acclaim, prompting grand felicitations of the director at the success meet. In 2001, he had two releases; the Telugu marital comedy Bava Nachadu and the family drama Samudhiram, in which he worked with Sarath Kumar again.

In 2002, Ravikumar made a third collaboration with Kamal Haasan through the comedy drama Panchathanthiram, which was produced by his manager P. L. Thenappan. Telling the story of five friends and a trip to Bangalore which goes awry, the film opened to rave reviews and made profits at the box office. Villain (2002), his first film featuring Ajith Kumar, was shot swiftly within forty days and also became a blockbuster upon release. He later remade the film in Telugu in 2003 under the same name with Rajasekhar in the lead role, after finishing Paarai (2003), another village action film with Sarath Kumar. In 2004, he began production on a third film starring Rajinikanth titled Jaggubhai. Ravikumar spent six months on pre-production works and missed out on the opportunity to direct Kamal Haasan in Vasool Raja MBBS during the period, but the film was later shelved after a photo shoot. Rajinikanth had asked for changes to the script and after several months of tinkering, the pair decided to part ways and abandon the project. He moved on to make Aethiree (2004), a film about an imposter gangster with Madhavan, before agreeing terms with NIC Arts to make a follow up film with Ajith Kumar in three roles from November 2004, after Villain'''s success. Despite beginning production soon after the launch, financial problems meant that it progressed slowly and Varalaru, only had a theatrical release in late 2006. The film, however, won positive reviews and became the blockbuster hit for Ajith until that date. In between, he worked quickly on another action drama, Saravana (2006) with Silambarasan, a remake of the Telugu film Bhadra (2005).

Ravikumar collaborated with Kamal Haasan again in the high-budget venture Dasavathaaram (2008), where the actor portrayed ten different roles. Revealing that the film was an action adventure, encompassing mankind's concern for the environment, science and faith, Dasavathaaram became Ravikumar's most expensive and lengthy shoot till date. The film opened to positive reviews and became the most profitable Tamil film of 2008, with Ravikumar's work garnering a Filmfare Best Tamil Director Award nomination. Aadhavan (2009) featuring Suriya and Nayantara was his next release, and it saw him return to his standard "commercial packaging" and the film performed well at the box office. His shelved venture, the family-drama Jaggubhai (2010), re-began shoot with Sarath Kumar and Shriya Saran in mid 2008 but delays meant that the film was only released in January 2010, after a leaked copy had found itself online. He made a further collaboration with Kamal Haasan again in the romantic comedy Manmadan Ambu (2010), though the film opened to mixed reviews and collections.

 2013–2019 
After he completed his work, he began production on his first Hindi film, adapting director Hari's Tamil film Saamy in a venture titled Policegiri (2013) with Sanjay Dutt in the lead role. However, despite a high profile launch, production was troubled as a result of Dutt's impending arrest. Subsequently, the film was rushed with Ravikumar only able to use ten days of Dutt's forty-day schedule for the film, and the director noted he mentally prepared himself for the subsequent box office failure. In January 2014, a felicitation event titled Endrendrum Ravikumar was held at the Nehru Indoor Stadium marking the director's 25th year in the industry and was attended by several of Ravikumar's contemporaries and colleagues. Following the completion of Kochadaiiyaan, Ravikumar began work on a new venture titled Lingaa (2014) with Rajinikanth, rather than reviving Rana. Signing on Anushka Shetty and Sonakshi Sinha in other lead roles, production began in May 2014 and period scenes were shot around sets in Karnataka. The film was completed in a period of 120 days, considerably shorter than any other film of equal budget or film starring Rajinikanth in recent times and opened to successful collections commercially. Prior to release, Ravikumar and his scriptwriter Ponkumaran, successfully evaded legal action from claims of plagiarism regarding the script. He has directed featuring Sudeep, a bilingual film Mudinja Ivana Pudi in Tamil and Kotigobba 2 in Kannada language as the lead role. Both languages of the film have been successful in their industry. He later directed two Telugu actions films with Nandamuri Balakrishna in Jai Simha (2018) and Ruler (2019).

 2020–present

After Ayya Ullen Ayya (2020) and Naan Sirithal (2020),  K. S. Ravikumar makes a solid start in his first-ever film Mathil (2021) as the lead.

 Style of working 

 Production 

Ravikumar's films are usually in the masala genre, with action, family sentiment, comedy, betrayal, revenge and redemption appearing as key themes. The decision against marking art films was a self-made decision, despite making his debut with a significantly different thriller in Puriyaadha Pudhir. Ravikumar has often associated with the same team of writers and assistants since his early career, with actor-director Ramesh Khanna being a near constant fixture in his team since a shelved venture titled Pudhu Kaaviyam was announced in 1990. Rather than considering his original storylines, Ravikumar has primarily gathered plots from other writers, refined them and adapted them into screenplays. He has also regularly associated with Erode Soundar in village action films, M. A. Kennedy in romantic comedies and Crazy Mohan in ventures featuring Kamal Haasan. Ravikumar often works on the script with his own story discussion team, away from his assistant directors, revealing that writing was "a personal process". However, for the production of Lingaa (2014), he revealed that the rush to finish the film by December 2014, meant he was unable to stay solely focused on the script and ventured out to help his assistants scout locations and arrange schedules.

Ravikumar is renowned for his quick schedules and his prompt completion of films, with Sify noting he is often considered a "film producer's delight" for his ability to stay within time and budget allotments. He made an exception for his quick paced schedules with Kamal Haasan's Dasavathaaram (2008), indicating it was significantly more difficult to make than his previous ventures and involved extensive simultaneous CGI work to production. The shooting for Lingaa, one of the most expensive films in Tamil film history, was completed within 120 days. The duration was significantly smaller than any other Tamil film of equal budget, as well as for any recent film starring a leading actor, such as Rajinikanth, in the main role. Ravikumar has also made cameo appearances in most of his directorial ventures, likening them to Alfred Hitchcock's cameo appearances.

 Approach to actors 
Ravikumar has often chosen to work with established actors rather than newcomers, indicating that they are commercially more viable than newcomers, and are easier to handle them as they are more experienced. He has regularly worked on his scripts only after finalising the lead actor, adding changes in the original plot line in order to blend it into the actor's image. Describing his collaborations with Rajinikanth, Ravikumar noted he ensured that each scene was discussed with the actor during the making of Padayappa (1999) and that Rajinikanth decided exactly where to place punch dialogues in order to attract audiences. Referring to his work with Kamal Haasan, he noted that the actor would describe a detailed scene on how to make his core audience of "city-slickers" laugh during the making of Thenali (2000) and Panchatanthiram (2002), and then request Ravikumar to add a slapstick element to make it applicable to village audiences too. Ravikumar has also often collaborated with Sarath Kumar, who has since dedicated his success to the director's opportunities, with the pair working on several quickly shot village action films in the 1990s.

Ravikumar's temper with technicians has often been described to be "constantly on the edge", with assistant directors often remarking that Ravikumar yells regularly on set to ensure the production team work more efficiently. Director Cheran revealed that during his stint as an assistant director, he fell out with Ravikumar and was subsequently left out of the team of Purusha Lakshanam (1993) after irking the director.

 Filmography All films are in Tamil, unless otherwise noted.''

As director

As producer

As writer

As actor

References

External links 

 

Indian male film actors
Tamil male actors
Telugu film directors
Tamil film directors
Tamil-language film directors
Tamil screenwriters
Living people
1957 births
Tamil Nadu State Film Awards winners
Hindi-language film directors
Kannada film directors
20th-century Indian film directors
21st-century Indian film directors
Film directors from Tamil Nadu
People from Tiruvallur district
Screenwriters from Tamil Nadu
Male actors in Tamil cinema